Lenine Raion is one of the 25 regions of the Crimea. It is located in the eastern part of the peninsula. The population of the district speaks 86% Russian, 9% Ukrainian, and 5% Other. The administrative centre of Lenine Raion is the urban-type settlement of Lenine. Population: 

Populated places include: Cheliadinove, Ohon'ky, Kostyrine, Naberezhne, Frontove, and Zavitne

References

Raions of Crimea